The 1950–51 Boston Bruins season was the Bruins' 27th season in the NHL.

Offseason

Regular season

Final standings

Record vs. opponents

Schedule and results

Playoffs

Player statistics

Regular season
Scoring

Goaltending

Playoffs
Scoring

Goaltending

Awards and records

Transactions

See also
1950–51 NHL season

References

External links

Boston Bruins season, 1950-51
Boston Bruins season, 1950-51
Boston Bruins seasons
Boston
Boston
1950s in Boston